Lumnamping College is a private college located in Tak Province, Thailand. The college was established in 1998 and is named after the nearby Ping River.

The college has three faculties:
 Faculty of Business Administration
 Faculty of Humanities
 Faculty of Political Science

See also
 List of universities in Thailand

External links 
 Official website

Colleges in Thailand
Tak province
Educational institutions established in 1998
1998 establishments in Thailand